The University of Applied Sciences of Eastern Switzerland is a governing body of the four Universities of Applied Science in Eastern Switzerland. They are located in St. Gallen, Rapperswil, Chur and Buchs.

University of Applied Sciences of Eastern Switzerland (FHO)

The following Universities of Applied Science are the members in the union:
 University of Applied Sciences St. Gallen (FHS) (Bearer: Cantons St. Gallen, Thurgau, Appenzell Ausserrhoden, Appenzell Innerrhoden) 
 University of Applied Sciences Rapperswil (HSR) (Bearer: Cantons St. Gallen, Zürich (until September 2008), Schwyz, Glarus) 
 Hochschule für Technik und Wirtschaft|University of Applied Sciences for Engineering and Economy (HTW) (Bearer: Canton Graubünden) 
 NTB: Interstate University of Applied Sciences of Technology Buchs (Bearer: Cantons St. Gallen and Graubünden, and also the Principality of Liechtenstein)

References

External links
 Website Fachhochschule Ostschweiz (FHO) (in German)
 Website Fachhochschule St. Gallen (FHS) (in German)
 Website Hochschule für Technik Rapperswil (HSR) (in German)
 Website Hochschule für Technik und Wirtschaft Chur (HTW) (in German)
 Interstaatliche Hochschule für Technik Buchs (NTB) (in German)

Universities of Applied Sciences in Switzerland
Appenzell Ausserrhoden
Appenzell Innerrhoden
Canton of Glarus
Grisons
Canton of Schwyz
Buildings and structures in St. Gallen (city)
Education in Liechtenstein
Buildings and structures in Rapperswil-Jona